Heterophrynus is a genus of whip spiders, also known as tailless whip scorpions (order Amblypygi), of the family Phrynidae. It is mostly distributed in South America.

Species

There are 16 species:
Heterophrynus alces Pocock, 1902
Heterophrynus armiger Pocock, 1902
Heterophrynus batesii Butler, 1873
Heterophrynus boterorum Giupponi & Kury, 2013
 Heterophrynus caribensis Armas, Torres-Contreras & Alvarez Garcia, 2015
Heterophrynus cervinus Pocock, 1894
Heterophrynus cheiracanthus Gervais, 1842 (type species)
Heterophrynus elaphus Pocock, 1903
Heterophrynus gorgo Wood, 1869
 Heterophrynus guacharo de Armas, 2015
Heterophrynus longicornis Butler, 1873
Heterophrynus pumilio C.L. Koch, 1840
Heterophrynus seriatus Mello-Leitão, 1940
 Heterophrynus silviae Giupponi & Kury, 2013
Heterophrynus vesanicus Mello-Leitão, 1931
Heterophrynus yarigui Alvarez Garcia, de Armas & Diaz Perez, 2015

References

Amblypygi
Cave arachnids